Giovanni Sirovich (born 8 September 1971) is an Italian sabre fencer. He competed in the men's team sabre at the 1992 Summer Olympics. He won the gold medal in the 1993 Summer Universiade and the same year a team silver medal in the World Championships. He became a fencing coach after his retirement as an athlete. He is now technical director for sabre at the Federazione Italiana Scherma.

References

External links

 
 Profile  at the European Fencing Confederation

1971 births
Living people
Fencers from Rome
Italian male fencers
Italian sabre fencers
Olympic fencers of Italy
Fencers at the 1992 Summer Olympics
Universiade medalists in fencing
Universiade gold medalists for Italy